Planning for global territorial expansion of the Axis powers; Germany, Italy and Japan, progressed before and during the Second World War. This included some special strike plans against the Allied nations (with similar intentions to the James Doolittle raid special Allied Strike). The Kingdom of Romania, a de facto major member of the Axis with a contribution on par with Italy's, is also included.

Operational plans of Germany, Italy and Romania

1936-1939
 italian conquest of Absinia after the Second Italo-Ethiopian War
 Italian occupation of Majorca (included the intention of annexing the Balearic Islands, Ceuta and Spanish morocco, and then creating a client state in Spain)
 Operation Schulmeister (proposed cession of the Balearic Islands by the Spanish Republic to Italy in exchange of neutrality in the Spanish Civil War).
 Proposed cession of the Balearic or Canary Islands by the Spanish Republic to Germany in exchange of neutrality in the Spanish Civil War.
 Italian occupation of Albania after the Italian invasion of Albania

1939–1940
 Fall Grün (planned invasion of Czechoslovakia, to be carried out in September 1938. Averted by the signing of the Munich Agreement. Not to be confused with the military plan to invade Ireland by the same name, see below)
 Operation Weiß (invasion of Poland. Carried out 1 September 1939)
 Operation Himmler (false flag operation to provide a casus belli for the invasion of Poland, including the Gleiwitz incident)
 Operation Weserübung (invasion of Denmark and Norway. Carried out 9 April 1940)
 Operation Gelb (invasion of the Netherlands, Belgium and Luxembourg. Carried out 10 May 1940)
 Operation Rot (invasion of France and principal western attack. Carried out 5 June 1940)
 Operation Sea Lion (invasion of Great Britain, not carried out)
 Operation Herbstreise (a planned series of deception operations to support Sea Lion)
 Operation Green (invasion of Ireland in support of Sea Lion, also known as Fall Grün. Not to be confused with the military plan to invade Czechoslovakia by the same name, see above)
 Operation Marita (invasion of Greece, carried out later)
 Operation Barbarossa (invasion of USSR, carried out later)
 Italian Operations: invasion of Albania, first attempt to invade Greece (Greco-Italian War)
 Operation Ikarus (invasion of Iceland, not carried out)
 Operation Felix (Spanish/German joint plan for control of Gibraltar, Canary Islands, Cape Verde, and Azores, it included the potential invasion of Portugal, Morocco and Spanish Sahara).
 Unnamed operation (subsequent occupation of Madeira)
 Unnamed operation (first attempt at reinforcing Italian Libya with German forces)
 Operation Tannenbaum (invasion plan for Switzerland)
 Projected German administrative divisions of occupied western and northern territories:
 Reichskommissariat Norwegen (implemented in 1940)
 Reichskommissariat Niederlande (implemented in 1940)
 Reichskommissariat Belgien-Nordfrankreich (implemented in 1944)
 Greater Germanic Reich (theoretical planning mostly)

1941–1944

 Operation Marita (invasion of Greece, Germany supporting the Italian efforts. Carried out 6 April 1941.)
 Operation 25 (invasion of Yugoslavia. Carried out 6 April 1941)
 Operation Merkur (invasion of Crete. Carried out 20 May 1941.)
 Operation Sonnenblume (Erwin Rommel and the Afrika Korps reinforcing the Axis defenses of Cyrenaica in 1941)
 Operation Isabella (invasion of Portugal and Spain to counter any possible landing of Anglo-American troops in the Iberian peninsula. Prepared in May 1941 and never carried out.)
 Operation Ilona (a plan aiming to counter an Anglo-American invasion of Iberia by holding north Spanish ports to protect German positions in France. Prepared in 1942, never carried out.)
 Operation Barbarossa (invasion of USSR, carried out 22 June 1941.)
 Operation München (joint Romanian-German invasion of Bessarabia and Northern Bukovina. Carried out 2 July 1941.)
 Operation Silver Fox (plan to capture the Soviet nickel mines of Pechengsky (Finnish: Petsamo) and the port city of Murmansk. Carried out 29 June 1941.)
 Operation Reindeer (plan to occupy the mines of Pechengsky)
 Operation Platinum Fox (plan to capture Murmansk)
 Sea of Azov Offensive Operation (joint German-Romanian offensive to capture the Azov coast. Carried out 12 September 1941.)
 Operation Typhoon (strategic pincer offensive against the Moscow region. Carried out 2 October 1941.)
 Operation Wotan (tank operation with the goal of capturing Moscow)
 Siege of Odessa (German-assisted Romanian offensive to capture the port city of Odessa and complete the Romanian conquest of Transnistria. Carried out 8 August 1941.)
Operation Bajadere (disputed German-Indian special forces operation for a planned strike through the Caucasus into Iran, Afghanistan and India in January 1942.)
German plans to invade Sweden with the 25th Panzer Division in Norway (and failed attempts to have finnish co-operation) during March 1942 after the Februarikrisen.
 Operation Störfang (combined German-Romanian assault supported by Italian naval units to capture the Crimean port city of Sevastopol. Carried out 2 June 1942.)
 Operation Pastorius (failed sabotage mission to destroy military, manufacturing and transportation targets throughout the United States. Carried out 12 June 1942, but foiled during the summer.)
 Operation Gertrud (projected German-Bulgarian-Armenian invasion of Turkey in case it joined the Allies in the beginning of the summer of 1942)
 Operation Blau (strategic summer offensive in southern USSR. Carried out 28 June 1942.)
 Operation Fischreiher (plan to advance to the Volga river and capture the city of Stalingrad. Carried out 22 July 1942.)
 Operation Edelweiss (plan to capture the oil fields of Baku. Carried out 23 July 1942.)
 Operation Nordlicht (scheduled operation to capture Leningrad, planned to begin on 23 August 1942. Not carried out due to the Soviet Sinyavino Offensive on 19 August.)
 Operation Polar Fox (attempted invasion of Sweden from German occupied Norway during June-July 1943)
 Operation Citadel (pincer offensives with the goal of encircling of Red Army forces after the Battle of Stalingrad. Carried out 4 July 1943.)
 Operation Theseus/Aida (invasion of Egypt and Suez Canal from Libya)
 Plan Orient (projected german invasion of Middle East and linking with japanese forcess to conquest India. Mostly by Afrika Corps in Libya and Egypt, but also troops from Bulgaria and the Balkans, and troops from Caucasus and Southern Russia)
 Operation Attila/Anton (occupation of un-occupied zone of France after allied landings in French North Africa to prevent an Allied invasion of Southern France)
 Operation Herkules (revision of previous plans to invade Malta)
 Operation François (attempt made by the German Army's Abwehr to use the dissident Qashqai people in Iran to rebelling against the British)
 Operation Pelikan (German plan for crippling the Panama Canal)
 Operation Achse (German invasion of Italy after its resignation from the Axis alliance to install a puppet government under Mussolini. Carried out 8 September 1943.)
 Operation Rabat (alleged German plan of invasion to the Vatican City to kidnap or kill Pope Pius XII. Planned to begin on late 1943/January 1944. Not carried out because the worldwide disapprobation and possible reaction of catholic population against Italian Social Republic.)
 Operation Margarethe I (German invasion of Hungary. Carried out 19 March 1944.)
 Operation Margarethe II (scheduled German invasion of Romania)
 Operation Tanne Ost (German invasion with the goal of capturing the Finnish island of Suursaari (Russian: Gogland) in the Gulf of Finland after that country signed the Moscow Armistice on Lapland War).
 Operation Tanne West (scheduled German invasion of the Finnish-controlled Åland)
 Operation Panzerfaust (second German invasion of Hungary to depose Miklós Horthy and install a puppet government. Carried out 15 October 1944.)
 German military operations in the Slovak National Uprising to retain control of Slovakia
 Operation Wacht am Rhein (also known as the Battle of the Bulge. German panzer attack through the Ardennes with the goal of recapturing Antwerp and encircling of British Allied forces in Belgium and the Netherlands)
 Operation North Wind (plan to encircle and destroy the U.S. 7th Army and French 1st Army and recapture Strasbourg. Carried out 1 January 1945) 
 Operation Dentist (a planned follow-up encirclement of the U.S. 3rd Army. Never carried out due to the failure of North Wind.)
 Operation Spring Awakening (offensive operation on the Hungarian part of the Eastern front with the goal of recapturing Budapest, while simultaneously defending the Nagykanizsa oil fields south of Lake Balaton)
 Projected German administrative divisions in occupied eastern territories:
 Lokot Republic (implemented in 1942)
 Belarusian Central Rada (implemented in 1943)
 Reichskommissariat Ostland (implemented in 1941)
 Reichskommissariat Ukraine (implemented in 1941)
 Reichskommissariat Moskau (theorical planning only)
 Reichskommissariat Kaukasus (theorical planning only)
 Projected Romanian administrative divisions in occupied eastern territories:
 Transnistria Governorate (implemented in 1941, never fully annexed)
Projected Italian administrative divisions in occupied eastern territories:
 Italian Protectorate of Georgia.

Operational plans of Japan
Listed below are operations and invasion plans of the Japanese Empire from 1929-1942:

1929–1940
 Hokushin-ron (plans for a potential attack on the Soviet Union and the occupation of territorios from Manchuria to Central Siberia, making a territorial expansion to the north).
 Nanshin-ron (plans for a potential attack in the Pacific Islands and then in Southeast Asia).
 Attempts to take the China Far East Railway
 Manchurian Invasion, Mukden Incident
 Attempts to attack in Shanghai, January 28 Incident
 Attempts to invade the Chinese in Hopei province, Operation Nekka
 Attempts to invade the Chinese in Chahar province, Suiyuan Campaign (1936)
 Invasion into China (the "China Incident"), Second Sino-Japanese War
 Occupation of some Chinese East coastal provinces, Amoy Operation, Canton Operation, Hainan Island Operation, Swatow Operation, South Guangxi Operation
 Battles with Soviets in the Changkufeng/Khasan area, Battle of Lake Khasan
 Battles with Soviets and Mongols in Nomonhan Soviet-Japanese Border War (1939)
 Occupation of North Indochina, Indochina Expedition

1941–1943
 Control of all of Indochina
 Advances in the China Mainland, Second Sino-Japanese War
 Pearl Harbor strike
 Invasion of the Philippines
 Invasion of Thailand
 Invasion of the Dutch Indies (now Indonesia)
 Japanese Invasion of Burma
 Invasion of Guam and Wake Island
 Invasion of New Guinea/Solomons
 Christmas Island invasion
 Projected Invasion to Cocos (Keeling) Islands
 Japanese Invasion of the Gilbert Islands
 Japanese Invasion of Nauru and Ocean island
 Imphal and Kohima strikes ("Operation U") (attempts to India Invasion,"21 Operation")
 Planned occupation of Ceylon ("Invasion of Ceylon") 
 Occupation of Andaman and Nicobar Islands
 Capture of the Attu/Kiska islands (alternative operation together with the Midway operation)
 Intent for Hawaii Invasion (Battle of Midway) 
 Kantokuen (Renewed plans for an expansion to Siberia and Central Asia. Attempts to invade the Russian Far East, Eastern Siberia and Outer Mongolia)
 Western China invasion (Szechwan invasion or "Operation 5")
 Indian Invasion
 Planned invasion of the island of Madagascar
 Planned total conquest of all New Guinea and Solomon Islands
 extension of south square of defensive perimeter: (Melanesia/Polynesia Areas)
 Santa Cruz Island
 New Hebrides
 New Caledonia/Loyalty archipelago
 Fiji
 Samoa
 Tuvalu
 Tokelau
 Tonga
 Rejected proposal to invade Australia
 Planned invasion of New Zealand
 Planned invasion of Panama.
 Projected Japanese administrative divisions in occupied Asian and Pacific territories:
 Greater East Asia Co-Prosperity Sphere

See also
 Attacks on United States territory in North America during World War II
 List of World War II military operations
 Plan Kathleen

References

Operations
Cancelled invasions
Cancelled military operations of World War II
Axis powers
Axis powers